Viktor Shmalko (born ) is a Russian former road and track cyclist. He competed in the scratch event at the 2010 UCI Track Cycling World Championships.

Major results
2008
 2nd  Team pursuit, UCI Junior Track World Championships
2009
 UCI Track World Cup
3rd Scratch, Melbourne
2010
 National Track Championships
1st  Team pursuit
1st  Scratch
2011
 3rd  Scratch, European Under-23 Track Championships
 3rd Madison, National Track Championships
2012
 2nd Overall Baltic Chain Tour
 2nd Points race, National Track Championships

References

External links
 Profile at cyclingarchives.com

1990 births
Living people
Russian track cyclists
Russian male cyclists
Place of birth missing (living people)